The 1961 UCI Road World Championships took place on 3 September 1961 in Bern, Switzerland. The women's race took place on 10 August on the Isle of Man.

Results

Medal table

External links 

 Men's results
 Women's results
  Results at sportpro.it

 
UCI Road World Championships by year
UCI Road World Championships 1961
Uci Road World Championships, 1961
Sport in Bern
1961 in road cycling